The Gettler Boys were a group of toxicologists who studied under or worked with Alexander Gettler, the "father of forensic toxicology in America." They included Irving Sunshine, Arthur Tiber, Abraham Friereich and Henry Freimuth. Many Gettler Boys went on to become prominent toxicologists in their own right.

References

Bibliography 

American toxicologists